Dmitri Valentinovich Pinchuk (born 19 January 1984) is a former Russian professional football player.

Club career
He played in the Russian Football National League for FC Dynamo Makhachkala in 2006.

External links
 

1984 births
Living people
Russian footballers
Association football forwards
FC Chernomorets Novorossiysk players
FC Olimpia Volgograd players
FC Zhemchuzhina Sochi players
FC Taganrog players
FC Dynamo Vologda players
FC Smena Komsomolsk-na-Amure players
FC Mashuk-KMV Pyatigorsk players
FC Dynamo Makhachkala players